Slavej is a village in Municipality of Krivogaštani and was once known as Aleksandrovo.

Demographics
According to the 2002 census, the village had a total of 388 inhabitants. Ethnic groups in the village include:

Macedonians 381
Serbs 2
Others 5

References

Villages in Krivogaštani Municipality